Stephen James Shurtleff (born September 4, 1947) is an American politician from the state of New Hampshire. He formerly served as Speaker of the New Hampshire House of Representatives A member of the Democratic Party, he serves as a member of the New Hampshire House of Representatives from the Merrimack 11th district. Shurtleff is a Vietnam veteran and a retired Supervisory Deputy US Marshal. While in the NH House he has held the positions of Committee Chair, Minority Leader, as well as Majority Leader. He previously served eleven years as an At Large member of the Concord City Council (2007 to 2018).

Career
In 2004, Shurtleff ran for election to the New Hampshire House of Representatives as a Democrat. He was also elected as an at-large member of the Concord City Council in 2007.

Rep. Shurtleff served as the majority leader of the New Hampshire House in the 2012-14 session. When the Republican Party took control of the chamber in the 2014 elections in November 2014, the Democratic caucus elected Shurtleff as the new minority leader of the New Hampshire House, succeeding outgoing Speaker Terie Norelli as the Democratic leader. He served as speaker of the house from  2018 to 2020, while Democrats had the majority. In 2022, in the of bipartisanship, former Speaker Shurtleff was named Speaker Emeritus of the N.H.House by the Republican House Speaker Sherm Packard. He reportedly is the first member of the N.H.House to hold all four of House's leadership positions, Minority Leader, Majority Leader, Speaker and Speaker Emeritus.

Personal life
Rep. Shurtleff is from Ward One of Concord, New Hampshire, the village of Penacook.
In 2020 he was one of New Hampshire's four Presidential Electors. Which elected Joe Biden our 46th President.

Rep. Shurtleff is a graduate of the Harold Washington School, of the City College of Chicago. In 2013, Rep. Shurtleff received the Henry Toll Fellowship from the Council of State Government. In 2015, he received the Caroline Gross Fellowship to attend the Senior Government Executive training program at Harvard's Kennedy School. He has three grown children, Seth, Kristie and Nathan, as well as two grandchildren, Sarah and Alex.

References

External links

|-

|-

1947 births
2020 United States presidential electors
21st-century American politicians
Living people
New Hampshire city council members
Politicians from Concord, New Hampshire
Speakers of the New Hampshire House of Representatives
Democratic Party members of the New Hampshire House of Representatives